Tom Dickson is an American figure skating choreographer, coach, and former competitor. He is the 1980 Nebelhorn Trophy champion, 1982 St. Ivel International bronze medalist, and 1980 U.S. national junior champion.

Career
During his eligible career, Dickson won the U.S. Figure Skating Championships at junior level in 1980; at the senior level, he placed 5th at the 1984 Championships. He won the Nebelhorn Trophy in 1980. After ending his competitive career, Dickson skated with Ice Capades.

Choreography
Dickson started doing skating choreography when his former coach, Carlo Fassi, asked him to work with Chen Lu in 1991. Dickson also coaches at the Broadmoor Skating Club.

He has choreographed for the following skaters:

Jeremy Abbott.
Vaughn Chipeur. 
Rachael Flatt.
Marin Honda.
Ryan Jahnke.
Alex Johnson.
Rika Kihira.
Kim Chae-Hwa.
Yuna Kim. 
Ann Patrice McDonough.
Hannah Miller.
Satoko Miyahara.
Brandon Mroz.
Mirai Nagasu.
Yukina Ota. 
Parker Pennington.
Adam Rippon.
Matthew Savoie. 
Aki Sawada. 
Yuna Shiraiwa.
Nana Takeda.
Michael Villarreal
Megan Williams-Stewart.
You Young.
Agnes Zawadzki. 
Caroline Zhang. 

Dickson also choreographed the "Princess Classics" show for Disney on Ice. He won the USFSA's Paul McGrath Choreographer of the Year award in 2002, 2003, 2004, and 2006.

Personal life
Dickson was born on July 14, 1962. He began playing the oboe when he was ten years old. He married Swedish figure skater Catarina Lindgren in 1986 and their twins, a boy and a girl, were born in the late 1990s. Their son is named Kai.

Results

References

 "A Chat with Tom Dickson", Blades on Ice, October 2006.

External links
 Dickson answers Kids' Questions

American male single skaters
American figure skating coaches
Figure skating choreographers
Living people
Place of birth missing (living people)
1962 births